The Helenites were a popular Saint Lucian folk music group, led by Clement Springer.  The Helenites were, along with The Hewanorra Voices, one of the island's earliest popular folk stars.

References

Saint Lucian musical groups
Folk music groups